is a Japanese novelist.

Biography
Shūichi Yoshida was born in Nagasaki, and studied Business Administration at Hosei University. He won the Bungakukai Prize for New Writers in 1997 for his story "Saigo no Musuko", and the Akutagawa Prize in 2002 (the fifth time he'd been nominated for the prize) for "Park Life". In 2002 he also won the Yamamoto Shūgorō Prize for Parade, and for winning both literary and popular prizes Yoshida was seen as a crossover writer, like Amy Yamada or Masahiko Shimada.  In 2003 he wrote lyrics for the song "Great Escape" on Tomoyasu Hotei's album, 'Doberman'.  His 2007 novel, Akunin, won the Osaragi Jiro Prize and the Mainichi Publishing Culture Award, and was adapted into an award-winning 2010 film by Lee Sang-il. Another novel, Taiyo wa Ugokanai has been made into a 2020 film.

Works in English translation
 Villain (original title: Akunin), trans. Philip Gabriel (London: Pantheon, 2010) 
 Parade (original title: Parēdo), trans. Philip Gabriel (London: Harvill Secker, 2014)

Awards and nominations
Japanese Awards
 1997 - Bungakukai Prize for New Writers: Saigo no Musuko (The Last Son)
 2002 - Yamamoto Shūgorō Prize: Parēdo (Parade )
 2002 - Akutagawa Prize: Pāku Raifu (Park Life )
 2007 - Osaragi Jiro Prize: Villain
 2007 - Mainichi Publishing Culture Award: Villain
 2010 - Shiba Ryotaro Prize: Yokomichi Yonosuke (Yonosuke Yokomichi )

British Award
 2011 - Longlisted for the Independent Foreign Fiction Prize: Villain

Bibliography

Novels
, 2002 (Parade, London: Harvill Secker, 2014)
, 2003
, 2004
, 2004
, 2004
, 2006
, 2007 (Villain, London: Pantheon, 2010)
, 2008
, 2008
, 2008
, 2009
, 2011
, 2012
, 2012
, 2013
, 2014

Short story collections
, 1999
, 2001
, 2002
, 2003
, 2004
, 2006
, 2006
, 2007
, 2008
, 2009
, 2010

Adaptations
Tōkyōwankei was adapted into a 2004 TV drama starring Yukie Nakama.
Haru, Bānīzu de was made into a 2006 TV movie starring Hidetoshi Nishijima and Shinobu Terajima.
Shichigatsu Nijūyokka Dōri was made into a 2006 film starring Takao Ōsawa and Miki Nakatani.  It had the international English title Christmas on July 24th Avenue.
Parade was adapted into a 2010 film starring Tatsuya Fujiwara, Shihori Kanjiya, and model/actress Karina.  Its world premiere was held at Pusan International Film Festival 2009, including a sold-out panel with the five young stars.
Villain was adapted into a 2010 film starring Satoshi Tsumabuki, Eri Fukatsu and Akira Emoto.  It won five Japanese Academy awards in 2011.
Yokomichi Yonosuke (2013)
The Ravine of Goodbye (2013) (Sayonara Keikoku)

Notes

External links
 Shūichi Yoshida page at JLPP (Japanese Literature Publishing Project) 
 Shuichi Yoshida at J'Lit Books from Japan 

1968 births
Living people
Japanese writers
Japanese crime fiction writers
Akutagawa Prize winners
People from Nagasaki
Hosei University alumni